Keyla Ávila Perez (born 16 June 1990) is a Honduran taekwondo practitioner.

Personal life
She studied Physiotherapy at the National Autonomous University of Honduras, in Tegucigalpa. She has a daughter born in 2013.

Career
She has won  three bronze medals at the Pan American Taekwondo Championships. She was selected for the Taekwondo at the 2020 Summer Olympics – Women's +67 kg.

References

External links
 

1990 births
Living people
Honduran female taekwondo practitioners
Olympic taekwondo practitioners of Honduras
Taekwondo practitioners at the 2020 Summer Olympics
Sportspeople from Tegucigalpa
Pan American Games competitors for Honduras
Taekwondo practitioners at the 2019 Pan American Games
21st-century Honduran women